Costes may refer to:

People
 Arnaud Costes (b. 1973), French rugby union footballer
 Dieudonné Costes (1892–1973), French aviator
 Jean-Louis Costes (b. 1954), performing as "Costes," French noise musician, performance artist, and film actor

Other
 Hôtel Costes, a hotel in Paris, France, noted for its Hôtel Costes lounge music compilation CDs